Nicole Wittenberg (born 1979) is an American artist based in New York City. She is a curator, professor, writer, and painter. 

Wittenberg was born in San Francisco, CA, and received her BFA from the San Francisco Art Institute in 2003. She received the American Academy of Arts and Letters coveted John Koch Award for Best Young Figurative Painter in 2012. From 2011–2014 she served as a teacher at the New York Studio School of Drawing, Painting and Sculpture, and the Bruce High Quality Foundation University, and in 2017 she was a professor in the Critical Theory Department at the School of Visual Arts in New York City.

Wittenberg’s works are included in many prominent collections, including the Solomon R. Guggenheim Museum, New York, NY; The Albertina, Vienna, Austria; the Boston Museum of Fine Art, Boston, MA; and others. Exhibitions include The Female Gaze, Part Two: Women Look at Men at Cheim & Read Gallery, New York, NY; Painter's Painters: Gifts from Alex Katz, High Museum of Art Atlanta, GA; and In Her Hands, Skarstedt Gallery, New York, NY.

Work

Nicole Wittenberg is committed to making “lifelike” paintings and drawings that evoke an immersive feeling of a singular moment. Impassioned and awkward bodies caught mid-sex are lovingly and lusciously rendered in her paintings based on amateur porn videos. Eager spring trees in Maine glow with neon-chartreuse leaves and so much personality they feel like portraits. She captures afternoon sunlight reflecting off undulating waves in the Aegean Sea or the Savannah Sound through evocative marks in dry pastel. The chalky pigments contain a unique chromatic intensity that is difficult to capture in other media—colors seem to emanate their hues from some internal energy source. “They’re about sensation—the feeling of people, places, and things. I wanted to record them really quickly and in high chroma,” explains Wittenberg.

This emotive quality of the drawings carries into her oil paintings, but they require a different approach. Because oil paints are relatively transparent compared to pastels, Wittenberg experimented with adding various opaque grounds to the paintings until she achieved the desired luminosity. The technique produces canvases that glow as though they are charged with the scene’s light.

Though Wittenberg has recently focused on landscapes and portraits in nature, her practice has always aligned with a sensual familiarity with life. While in school at San Francisco Art Institute, she began making drawings from slow-motion videos, life models, and photographs. In 2014, that interest in photographic and pop-culture references extended to pornography, and inspired Wittenberg to begin painting from amateur porn.

Curator and painter David Salle praised her commitment to reinventing realism with more brute force than her predecessors or contemporaries. "People think everything's been done, but that's not true." "[Wittenberg] dares herself to do precisely that which scares her."

Wittenberg further sets herself apart from the history of nude painting by depicting sexually aroused men instead of the conventional objectified female form....sexualized men are underrepresented, almost taboo in art history.

When discussing her observation-based work, Wittenberg says that “the biggest challenge is to trust what I see, even when it conflicts with what I think I see...Often, reality contrasts to how I think things should look.” This dedication to trusting her eyes—even when they tell her that the backlit spring leaves need an acidic yellow to bring out their natural vibrance, or when a sunset calls for neon pink to brighten the layers of translucent oil paint—reveals the extravagant beauty of the world.

Personal life
She currently lives and works in Chinatown in New York City.

Exhibitions 

 Sunday Kind of Love, Nina Johnson Gallery, Miami, FL, 2020
 In Her Hands, curated by David Salle, Skarstedt Gallery, NYC, 2020
 Downtown Painting, Peter Freeman Gallery, NYC, 2019
 Look! New Acquisitions at the Albertina, Vienna, Austria, 2017
 Will You Still Love Me Tomorrow, Galerie Lisa Kandlhofer, Vienna, Austria, 2017
 The Female Gaze, Part Two: Women Look at Men, Cheim Read Gallery, NYC, 2016
 DICKS, Fortnight Institute, NYC, 2016
 Nice Weather, curated by David Salle, Skarstedt Gallery, NYC, 2016
 A Stay in the Paphos Loop, Offspace.xyz, NYC, 2016
 Painter's Painters: Gifts from Alex Katz, High Museum of Art Atlanta, GA, 2015
 Night Tide, curated by Jarrett Earnest, Gallery Diet, Miami, FL, 2014
 Come Together: Surviving Sandy, Year 1, 2013
 The Malingerers, Freight+Volume, New York, NY, 2012
 Invitational Exhibition of Visual Arts, New York, NY, 2012
 Brucennial, New York, NY, 2012
 The Fitting Room, Vogt Gallery, New York, NY, 2011

Permanent Collections 

Works by this artist can be seen at:

 Albertina, Vienna, Austria
 Aishti Foundation, Beirut, Lebanon
 Solomon R. Guggenheim Museum, New York, NY
 High Museum of Art, Atlanta, GA
 Museum of Fine Arts, Boston, MA
 Colby College Museum of Art, Waterville, ME 
 Bowdoin College Museum of Art, Brunswick, ME 
 Farnsworth Art Museum, Rockland, ME
 Portland Museum of Art, Portland, ME

References

External links 
 NicoleWittenberg.com

Living people
21st-century American women artists
Artists from New York City
1979 births
Artists from San Francisco 
San Francisco Art Institute alumni